The Iranian Queer Organization (IRQO), also known as the Persian Gay and Lesbian Organization, was an advocacy group for LGBT rights in Iran based in Toronto, Ontario, Canada. The organization was founded by human rights activist Arsham Parsi and monitors violations of gay rights in Iran. Under the Islamic laws of Iran, homosexuality is punishable by death.

Arsham Parsi left the organization and founded a new organization called the Iranian Railroad for Queer Refugees.

While living in Iran in 2001, Parsi founded an internet group that later became known as the Persian Gay and Lesbian Organization. The organization produces a monthly email newsletter called Cheraq (light) and has 6000 members in Iran.

IRQO provided an avenue for homosexuals in Iran to communicate with like minded activists around the world. Following the Iranian election protests in 2009, IRQO distributed an open letter from university students in Iran deploring the state of gay rights in the country. The organization also published a letter from gay Iranian Mehdi Kazemi after his boyfriend was executed and he was at risk for deportation to Iran.

In 2008, IRQO was one of the two winners of the International Gay and Lesbian Human Rights Commission's (IGLHRC) Felipa de Souza Award and Arsham Parsi received that award at the New York's ceremony.

IRQO dissolved the organization in March 2019.

See also 
 LGBT rights in Iran
 Iranian Railroad for Queer Refugees

References

External links 
 

LGBT rights in Iran
LGBT political advocacy groups in Canada
Organizations established in 2007
Queer organizations
Non-profit organizations based in Toronto
2007 establishments in Ontario
Felipa de Souza Award